is a Japanese light novel series written by Nana Nanato and illustrated by Siokazunoko. The series originated on the novel posting websites Hameln and Kakuyomu in 2020, before beginning publication under Fujimi Shobo's Fujimi Fantasia Bunko light novel imprint in May 2021, who have published six volumes as of January 2023. The series is licensed in English by J-Novel Club. A manga adaptation will be serialized in Kadokawa Shoten's Comp Ace magazine. An anime television series adaptation has been announced.

Characters

Media

Light novel
The series is written by Nana Nanato and illustrated by Siokazunoko. It originated as a web novel published on the Hameln novel website on June 22, 2020, then also on the Kakuyomu website on August 4, 2020. It was later acquired by Fujimi Shobo, who began publishing the series under their Fujimi Fantasia Bunko light novel imprint on May 20, 2021. As of January 2023, six volumes have been released. In March 2022, J-Novel Club announced that they had licensed the series for English publication.

Manga
A manga adaptation was announced on June 11, 2021. It will be serialized in Kadokawa Shoten's Comp Ace magazine.

Anime
An anime television series adaptation was announced on January 19, 2023.

References

External links
  at Hameln 
  at Kakuyomu 
  
 

2021 Japanese novels
Anime and manga based on light novels
Fujimi Fantasia Bunko
J-Novel Club books
Kadokawa Shoten manga
Light novels
Light novels first published online
Novels about social media
Seinen manga
Television series about social media
Upcoming anime television series
VTubers